X Marks the Spot is a 1931 American pre-Code crime drama film directed by Erle C. Kenton and released by Tiffany Pictures, which operated from 1921 to 1932.

The story concerns a newspaper reporter indebted to a gangster for raising the money to save his little girl's life.  The source material was remade into a 1942 film of the same name.  Helen Parrish appeared in both versions.

Cast
 Lew Cody as George Howard 
 Sally Blane as Sue 
 Wallace Ford as Ted Lloyd 
 Fred Kohler as Riggs 
 Mary Nolan as Vivian Parker 
 Virginia Lee Corbin as Hortense 
 Helen Parrish as young Gloria 
 Joyce Coad as Gloria 
 Charles B. Middleton as Attorney 
 Clarence Muse as Servant

References

External links
 
 New York Times contemporary review
 

1931 films
Films directed by Erle C. Kenton
Tiffany Pictures films
1931 crime drama films
American crime drama films
American black-and-white films
Films about journalists
1930s English-language films
1930s American films